Handball Club Dinamo-Minsk is a former team handball club from Minsk, Belarus. Currently, HC Dinamo-Minsk competes in the Belarus First League of Handball. HC Dinamo-Minsk is a five-time Belarus league champion (2009, 2010, 2011, 2012, 2013 ), winner of the Baltic League (2009), winner of the Cup of Belarus (2010) and the finalist of the Cup of Belarus (2009). Due to financial troubles, the club was dissolved in 2014.

Notable former players
  Dean Bombač (2013-2014)
  Pavel Atman
  Rade Mijatović
  Ratko Nikolić
  Dimitrije Pejanović
  Oleg Skopintsev
  Sergiy Onufriyenko (2009–2013)

External links
Official website

Belarusian handball clubs
Sport in Minsk